Villanovafranca (Biddanoa Franca, Bidda Noa Franca in Sardinian) is a comune (municipality) in the Province of South Sardinia in the Italian region Sardinia, located about  north of Cagliari and about  northeast of Sanluri.

Villanovafranca borders the following municipalities: Barumini, Escolca, Gesico, Guasila, Las Plassas, Villamar.

Big attractions are the nuraghe Su Mulinu with its homonym museum and the church of San Lorenzo.

History 
The name Villanovafranca is believed to have its origins in the fact that the town was a tax free zone. However, there are no documents that clarify whether the villa was built with the benefits of the concessions or, like all the other Villanovae, it was born with rural function and changed its name when it acquired the concessions. However, the presence of nuragic settlements is confirmed, demonstrating that a residential center existed even before it took its current name.

The famous scholar Goffredo Casalis in his works, at the end of the list of the Marmilla villages, wrote: "[...] from Arbarei [...] to Villanovaforru and Villanovafranca. All the pre-named populations are of immemorial antiquity. Most recent of all it seems Villanovafranca up the extremity of the department and frontier of the Arborense kingdom".

Still, Pasquale Tola is the first among scholars to mention a date of foundation of the town, 1219.

The current town was built in the Aragonese period (around the 15th century), and in 1541 it was incorporated into the Barony of Las Plassas, a fief of the Zapata family. It was redeemed from the last feudal lord, Don Lorenzo Zapata Spiga Vivaldi, baron of Las Plassas, in 1839 with the suppression of the feudal system. Since then it became a municipality administered by a mayor and a municipal council.

Monuments and places of interest

Archaeological sites 

 Nuraghe Su Mulinu
 Nuraghe Tuppedili
 Nuraghe Trattasi
 Nuraghe Paberi
 Nuraghe Barraka is Dragonis
 Nuraghe Cuccuru S'Arriu
 Nuraghe Barbaraxinu
 Nuraghe Perdu Atzeni

Religious architectures 

 Parish church of San Lorenzo, inside which there is a marble pulpit from the 1800s, numerous wooden statues (the Santus arrimaus) including that of the patron San Lorenzo, a Neapolitan work, enriched by a silver grill that characterizes it. The eighteenth-century organ is also noteworthy. Center of Villanovan religious life, its characteristic bell tower and octagonal dome are easily visible in the valleys and hills of the Marmilla, as well as in most of the municipality of Villanovafranca.

 Church of San Sebastiano
 Church of San Francesco da Paola
 Church of the Madonna della Salute, enriched with stone sculptures by the local artists Romano Porcu and Gesuino Murgia.

Civil architectures 

 Soldier's house
 War memorial
  
 Manor house Santa Cruz

Culture

Museum 
Su Mulinu Archaeological Museum, the former wheat storehouse or montegranatico: it was founded in 2002 and exhibits the objects found in the Su Mulinu site that span a chronological period from the Prehistoric Age to the Early Middle Ages.

Economy 
The production of durum wheat and the cultivation of olives, vines, almonds and saffron (a local product which has been awarded with the DOP (European Union Denomination of Protected Origin) mark) are particularly important in the municipal area. There are several agropastoral farms, some of considerable size, where pigs, sheep and cattle are raised. These local farms guarantee several jobs.

References

Cities and towns in Sardinia